The 1955 Richmond 200 was a NASCAR Grand National Series event that was held on May 22, 1955, at Richmond Fairgrounds (now Richmond Raceway) in Richmond, Virginia. Two hundred laps took place on a dirt track spanning . The exact time of the race was one hour, fifty minutes, and thirty seconds.

Qualifying was rained out so a draw for the pole position was held. All twenty-eight competitors were Americans. Individual race earnings for each driver ranged from $1,000 ($ when considering inflation) to $50 ($ when considering inflation); the total prize  given to competitors was $4,085 ($ when considering inflation).

Background
In 1953, Richmond International Raceway began hosting the Grand National Series with Lee Petty winning that first race in Richmond.  The original track was paved in 1968.  In 1988, the track was re-designed into its present D-shaped configuration

The name for the raceway complex was "Strawberry Hill" until the Virginia State Fairgrounds site was bought out in 1999 and renamed the "Richmond International Raceway".  The Strawberry Hill Races, which are a series of steeplechase horse races were formerly held the third Saturday of April at the Richmond Raceway Complex. In 2000, the races were moved to Colonial Downs in New Kent County, Virginia's first Thoroughbred racetrack.

Race report
Tim Flock won the race; beating his brother Fonty. Flock would acquire his third consecutive win. They both were driving 1955 Chrysler 300s. Flock would lead the most laps with 123 out of 200. Jim Paschal would score his 100th career NASCAR Grand National Series start in this event. Sonny Hutchins would make his NASCAR Cup Series debut in this race. Notable crew chiefs for this race were E.K. Adkins.

Local NASCAR owners like Junie Donlavey and Emanuel Zervakis would refine Hutchins' stock car driving skills shortly after the conclusion of this race. Jimmie Lewallen (driving the 1955 model year Oldsmobile 88 machine) finished in last place (his record listed the reason as being stuck in the mud). The number 88 designation may or may not have been an indirect promotion to the Oldsmobile 88 vehicle; one of the hottest selling vehicles during the mid-1950s.

Arden Mounts gained the pole from a draw. Henry Ford (no relation to the founder of the Ford Motor Company) would compete in the second-to-last race of his one-season career.

Other notable racers included: Lee Petty, Junior Johnson, and Billy Carden. Most drivers owned their own vehicle. Local gas stations would often have stock cars ready for that day's NASCAR Cup Series racing event. Since the race took place on a dirt track, speeds were generally lower than the races that took place on paved oval courses.

Qualifying

Finishing order

 Tim Flock† (No. 300)
 Fonty Flock† (No. 301)
 Lee Petty† (No. 42)
 Jim Paschal† (No. 78)
 Junior Johnson (No. 55)
 Bob Welborn (No. 44)
 Gene Simpson (No. 460)
 Elmo Langley† (No. 53)
 Volney Schulze (No. 69)
 George Parrish (No. 11)
 Dave Terrell* (No. 98)
 Slim Brown (No. 43)
 Nace Mattingly (No. 54)
 Johnny Roberts* (No. 900)
 Arden Mounts† (#18)
 Eddie Skinner* (No. 28)
 Buck Baker*† (No. 89)
 Harvey Henderson* (No. 121)
 Henry Ford* (No. 303)
 Mack Hanbury (No. 140)
 Billy Carden*† (No. 8)
 Carl Krueger* (No. 302)
 Ken Fisher* (No. 4)
 Dick Rathmann*† (No. 3)
 Fred Dove*† (No. 71)
 Sonny Hutchins*† (No. 97-A)
 Chick Dawson* (No. 444)
 Jimmie Lewallen*† (No. 88)

† signifies that the driver is known to be deceased 
* Driver failed to finish race

Timeline
Section reference: 
 Start of race: Jim Paschal starts the race in the pole position.
 Lap 3: Jimmie Lewallen's vehicle somehow managed to get into the mud and could not get out.
 Lap 11: The fuel line in Chick Dawson's vehicle became severed.
 Lap 15: Sonny Hutchins' vehicle managed to overheat itself.
 Lap 59: Dick Rathman takes over the lead from Jim Paschal.
 Lap 64: The pistons on Fred Dove's vehicle came to a screeching halt.
 Lap 66: The driveshaft on Dick Rathmann's vehicle stopped working properly.
 Lap 67: Jim Paschal takes over the lead from Dick Rathman.
 Lap 78: Tim Flock takes over the lead from Jim Paschal.
 Lap 95: The tie rod came loose off Ken Fisher's vehicle.
 Lap 99: Carl Krueger's vehicle managed to lose its spindle.
 Lap 109: Billy Carden managed to overheat his vehicle.
 Lap 115: Both Harvey Henderson and Henry Ford had problems with their vehicle, forcing them not to finish the race.
 Lap 133: Buck Baker's wheel fell off his vehicle, causing him to leave the event.
 Lap 141: Eddie Skinner's vehicle bearings became problematic, ending his day on the track.
 Lap 145: Johnny Roberts' car overheated, ending his weekend on the track.
 Lap 172: Dave Terrell developed a problem with his car's piston, forcing him out of the race.
 Finish: Tim Flock was officially declared the winner of the event.

References

Richmond 500
Richmond 500
NASCAR races at Richmond Raceway